Minister of Pensions may refer to:

Minister of Pensions (Britain)
Minister of Pensions (France)
Minister of Pensions and National Health (Canada)